Eric Charles Bensted (11 February 1901 – 24 March 1980) was a cricketer who played first-class cricket for Queensland from 1923 to 1936. 

Bensted, an all-rounder, was the first Queensland player to play in 50 Sheffield Shield matches. His highest score was 155 against  New South Wales in 1934-35, when he and  Cassie Andrews added 335 in 239 minutes for the seventh wicket after Queensland were 6 for 113. They set an Australian seventh-wicket record that stood until 2014.

References

External links
 
 Eric Bensted at CricketArchive

1901 births
1980 deaths
Australian cricketers
Queensland cricketers